Brett Williams is a former defensive end for the Los Angeles Xtreme of the XFL.

References

Year of birth missing (living people)
Living people
American football defensive ends
Los Angeles Xtreme players
Place of birth missing (living people)